Germany women's junior national softball team is the junior national team for Germany.  The team competed at the 2007 ISF Junior Women's World Championship in Enschede, Netherlands where they finished fourteenth.  The team competed at the 2011 ISF Junior Women's World Championship in Cape Town, South Africa where they finished fourteenth.

References

External links 
 International Softball Federation

Women's national under-18 softball teams
Softball in Germany
Softball